Simonsson may refer to:

Agne Simonsson (1935–2020), former Swedish footballer
Hans Simonsson (1880–1965), Swedish Navy vice admiral
Hans Simonsson (born 1962), retired professional tennis player from Sweden
Philip Simonsson (died 1217), Norwegian aristocrat, pretender to the throne of the Bagler party
Stefan Simonsson (born 1960), former professional tennis player from Sweden

Surnames from given names
Swedish-language surnames
Patronymic surnames